The 1919 PGA Championship was the second PGA Championship, which is now considered one of golf's major championships. It was held September 16–20 at the Engineers Country Club in Roslyn Harbor, New York, east of New York City on Long Island in Nassau County.

The PGA Championship was not held in 1917 or 1918 due to World War I. The field of 32 golfers qualified by sectional tournaments. They competed in 36-hole match play rounds in a single-elimination tournament. Defending champion Jim Barnes defeated Fred McLeod, 6 & 5, in the final.

Bracket 1

Bracket 2

Bracket 3

Bracket 4

Final four

References

External links
PGA Media Guide 2012
Results at golfobserver.com 
PGA.com – 1919 PGA Championship

PGA Championship
Golf in New York (state)
PGA Championship
PGA Championship
PGA Championship
PGA Championship